Château d'Auberoche  is a château in Dordogne, Nouvelle-Aquitaine, France. It was the site of the 1345 Battle of Auberoche in the Edwardian phase of the Hundred Years' War.

References 

Auberoche
Monuments historiques of Dordogne